Semer may refer to:

Places
Semer, Suffolk, England
Semer, Kızılcahamam, Turkey

People 
John Semer Farnsworth (1893–1952), American navy officer
Milton Semer (1919–2016), American lawyer

See also 
Seamer (disambiguation)